The 1812 Vermont gubernatorial election for Governor of Vermont took place in September, and resulted in the election of Jonas Galusha to a one-year term.

The Vermont General Assembly met in Montpelier on October 8. The Vermont House of Representatives appointed a committee to review the votes of the freemen of Vermont for governor, lieutenant governor, treasurer, and members of the governor's council. The committee's examination showed that Jonas Galusha defeated Martin Chittenden to win election to a fourth one-year term.

In the election for lieutenant governor, Paul Brigham defeated William Chamberlain to win his seventeenth one-year term. In this contest, one Vermont newspaper recorded the vote totals as: Brigham (Democratic-Republican), 17,887 (53.0%); Chamberlain (Federalist), 14,893 (44.2%); scattering, 952 (2.8%).

Benjamin Swan was elected to a one-year term as treasurer, his thirteenth, though the vote totals were not recorded. Swan, a Federalist was also endorsed by the Democratic-Republicans, and so was effectively unopposed for reelection.

In the race for governor, a contemporary newspaper article reported the results as follows.

Results

References

Vermont gubernatorial elections
gubernatorial
Vermont